Who Wants to Be a Millionaire? was a South African game show hosted by Jeremy Maggs and based on the original British format of Who Wants to Be a Millionaire?. The goal of the game was to win one million rand by answering fifteen multiple-choice questions correctly. Who Wants to Be a Millionaire? was shown on the South African TV station SABC 3. The program was shown on Wednesdays and Sundays. Earlier the quiz was aired on M-Net, which also used their logo in the programme's logo. Four series of the show were made. There was a project to make another version of the quiz show in Afrikaans, which launched on 27 October 2021 as Wie Word 'n Miljoenêr? airing on KykNET.

Payout structure

Top prize winners
David Paterson was the only million rand winner, on 19 March 2000. He was the first winner outside of the United States.

External links
 Official website

References

Who Wants to Be a Millionaire?
South African game shows
SABC 3 original programming
1999 South African television series debuts
2005 South African television series endings
2000s South African television series